Ove Gjedde (27 December 1594 – 19 December 1660) was a Danish nobleman and Admiral of the Realm (Rigsadmiral). He established the Danish colony at Tharangambadi (Danish: Trankebar) and constructed Fort Dansborg as the base for Danish settlement. He was a member of the interim government that followed the death of King Christian IV and which imposed restrictions (Haandfæstning) on his successor King Frederick III.

Early years
Gjedde was born at Tomarps (Tomarps Kungsgård)  at Åstorp in Scania. He  was the son of Brostrup Gjedde and Dorthe Pallesdatter Ulfeldt. He studied at Sorø Academy. He completed a tour to Germany and the Netherlands. Returning in 1616, he  was appointed secretary of the Danish Chancellor.

Career

In March 1618, Gjedde commanded an expedition to India and Ceylon to establish a Danish colony that could be used as a base for the China and East Indies trade of the Danish East India Company. His fleet consisted of the Danish naval ships Elefanten and David, the yacht Øresund, and the merchant ships Kiøbenhavn and Christian. He established  Fort Dansborg at Tranquebar, which would remain a Danish colony for 200 years. Gjedde returned in March 1622 and was appointed lord of Brunla len (now in Akershus).  In 1637, he received Tønsberg len (now Vestfold).
 
Gjedde acquired land properties in Norway, and was a central participant in the mining industry, and also became a partner in the silver mining venture of Kongsberg Sølvverk, which was founded in 1623 and formally established by royal resolution in the spring of 1624 when king Christian IV himself came to inspect the newly discovered silver deposits in Sandsvær. When the silver mine company was transformed into a private partnership in 1628, Ove Gjedde got a 25% share and from 1630 he was its director. In 1657, he established the iron foundry Ulefos Jernværk at Ulefoss in Nome, together with his brother in law Preben von Ahnen.

In 1628, he was appointed  Lieutenant Colonel of Akershus Regiment. He participated in the Torstenson War (1643–1645) as an admiral and in 1645 he was made Admiral of the Realm (Rigsadmiral). In 1648 he was granted the fiefdom of Helsingborg Castle.

Later years
After the peace in Roskilde, Denmark lost Scania to Sweden. When king Charles X Gustav of Sweden broke the peace of 1658, Ove Gjedde was taken prisoner, during a visit to Helsingborg. He was first sent to prison in Helsingborg castle, and later sent to Malmö. In 1660 he was released during prisoner exchanges between Sweden and Denmark. At the time Gjedde was an old and physically weak man, but although he had already commissioned a grave monument in Helsingborg, because this had now become Swedish, when he died he was buried in the crypt of Roskilde Cathedral. The legend says that, "His bones after the Roskilde peace never found rest, after Scania became Swedish".
Gjedde died at Copenhagen in 1660.

Personal life
In 1622, Gjedde married Dorothy Knudsdatter Urne (1600-1667), daughter of  Knud Axelsen Urne til Årsmarke (1564–1622) and Margrethe Eilersdatter Grubbe til Alslev (1568–1654). His wife was a sister of Christoffer Urne (1593–1663) who served as Steward of Norway. They were the parents of several children including Knud Ovessøn Gjedde and Brostrup Gjedde both of whom served as County governors in Norway.

 Dorte Gjedde (1625-?) - daughter
 Brostrup Gjedde (1628–1668) - son
 Margrethe Gjedde (16??-1706) - daughter
 Merete Gjedde (16??-1689) - daughter
 Regitze Sophie Gjedde (1634-1653) - daughter
 Knud Ovessøn Gjedde (1635-1708) - son
 Frederick Eiler Gjedde (1641-1717) - son

See also
 Danish India

References

External links
  Ove Gjedde Trankebar Net 
Om Ove Gieddes ekspedition til Ceylon og Tranquebar 1618-1622 Danmarks Historien 

1594 births
1660 deaths
People from Scania
Danish admirals
Danish India
Royal Dano-Norwegian Navy personnel